is a song recorded by Japanese pop singer Sayuri Sugawara. The single was released on May 19, 2010 by For Life Music. The title track is the theme song for the Japanese television drama of the same name.

Track listing

References 

2010 singles
The Sxplay songs
2010 songs
Songs written by Sin (music producer)
Song recordings produced by Sin (music producer)